The M1 motorway connects London to Leeds, where it joins the A1(M) near Aberford, to connect to Newcastle. It was the first inter-urban motorway to be completed in the UK; the first motorway in the country was the Preston Bypass, which later became part of the M6.

Most of the motorway was opened between 1959 and 1968. The southern end was extended in 1977 and the northern end was extended in 1999.

History
There had been plans before the Second World War for a motorway network in the United Kingdom. Lord Montagu formed a company to build a 'motorway like road' from London to Birmingham in 1923, but it was a further 26 years before the Special Roads Act 1949 was passed, which allowed for the construction of roads limited to specific vehicle classifications, and in the 1950s, the country's first motorways were given the government go-ahead.

The first section of motorway was the Preston Bypass in Lancashire, now part of the M6 motorway, which opened in 1958. The M1 was Britain's first full-length motorway and opened in 1959. The early M1 had no speed limits, crash barriers, or lighting, and had soft shoulders rather than hard.

First section, 1959

The first section of the motorway, between junction 5 (Watford) and junction 18 (Crick/Rugby), opened on 2 November 1959, together with the motorway's two spurs, the M10 (from junction 7 to south of St Albans originally connecting to the A1) and the M45 (from junction 17 to the A45 and Coventry). Parts of the Hertfordshire section were built using steam rollers.

The M1 was officially inaugurated from Slip End (close to Luton), celebrated by a large concrete slab on the bridge next to the village, with inscription "London-Yorkshire Motorway – This slab was sealed by the Harold Watkinson M.P. – Minister of Transport – Inauguration Day – 24th March 1958". It was relocated, during widening works in 2007–08, to the eastern side of junction 10.

This section of the M1 broadly follows the route of the A5 north-west. It started at the Watford Bypass (A41), which runs south-east to meet the A1 at Apex corner, and ended on the A5 at Crick. The M10 spur motorway connected the M1 to the North Orbital Road (A405/A414, a precursor of the M25) where it also met the A5 (now renumbered here as the A5183) and,  to the east via the A414, the A6, which subsequently became part of the M25.

Although the whole of the first section opened in 1959, it was built in two parts, with the northern part (junctions 10 to 18) being built by John Laing and the southern part (the St Albans Bypass) being built by Tarmac Construction.

Rugby to Leeds, 1965 to 1968
The continuation of the motorway from junction 18 towards Yorkshire was carried out as a series of extensions between 1965 and 1968. Diverging from the A5, the motorway takes a more northerly route through the East Midlands, via Leicester, Loughborough, Nottingham to Sheffield, where the M18 splits from the M1 at junction 32 to head to Doncaster.

Originally, the M1 was planned to end at Doncaster but it was decided to make what was going to be the "Leeds and Sheffield Spur" into the primary route, with the  section to the A1(M) south of Doncaster given the separate motorway number M18.

From junction 32, the motorway passes Sheffield, Rotherham, Barnsley and Wakefield, reaching the original end of the motorway at (the original) Junction 44 to the east of Leeds. There were plans to route the M1 from just south of junction 42, where it interchanges with the M62, round the west of Leeds to the A1 at Dishforth. The chosen route passes to the east of Leeds. With the M62 and M621, the M1 forms a ring of motorways around the south of Leeds.

Leeds South Eastern Urban Motorway, 1972

In 1972, an extension of the M1 was opened into central Leeds as the Leeds South Eastern Motorway, where it met the Leeds South Western Motorway (M621) coming north-east from the M62 at junction 3.

Lighting
In July 1972, the then UK Minister for Transport Industries, John Peyton, announced that  of UK motorway particularly prone to fog would benefit from lighting in a project that "should be" completed by 1973. Sections to be illuminated included the M1 between junctions 3 and 14, and between junctions 16 and 24.  In August 2011, the Highways Agency announced that, despite being converted to Smart Motorway status, the lights will be switched off on stretches of the motorway between junctions 10 (Luton) and 15 (Northampton) without affecting road user safety. The motorway junctions and their approaches, and a section of the M1 on either side of junction 11 (north Luton), would have lighting columns replaced and remain lit. All lighting columns from junctions 10 to 14 were removed completely, apart from some on slip roads.

Safety barriers
An increasing official interest in secondary safety was evident in an announcement in March 1973 that work would begin shortly on erecting "tensioned safety barriers" along the central reservation of a  section of the M1 between Kegworth (J24) and Barlborough (J30).

Leeds to Hook Moor, 1999
Between 1996 and 1999, the M1 section north of the M62 underwent a major reconstruction and extension to take the M1 on a new route to the A1(M) at Aberford. The new road involved the construction of a series of new junctions, bridges and viaducts to the east of Leeds. When the new section of M1 was completed and opened on 4 February 1999, the Leeds South Eastern Motorway section of the M1 was re-designated as the M621, and the junctions were given new numbers: M621 junctions 4 to 7.

London extensions, 1966, 1967 and 1977

The M1 was extended south towards London from its original starting point at junction 5, in three stages. The first stage, opened in 1966, took the motorway south-east, parallel to the A41, to meet the A5 at junction 4 south of Elstree. The second phase continued east to Scratchwood (London Gateway Services, which occupies the location of the missing junction 3, from where an unbuilt spur would have connected to the A1 at Stirling Corner to the north-east). The M1 then runs south alongside the Midland Main Line towards Hendon, where it meets the A1 again at junction 2 via a tightly curved flyover section. These flyovers connecting from the A1 were originally both for northbound traffic: the left one as the on-ramp to the M1, the right one going over the A1/A41 junction beneath to rejoin the A1 northbound.

Before the completion of junction 2, southbound traffic left the motorway via a slip road which passed around the back of the now disused Homebase and under the A41/A1 Mill Hill Bypass, and looped round to join it at Fiveways Interchange. This slip road is still visible to southbound traffic approximately  before junction 2, and was maintained until the early 2000s, even though not accessible to traffic. The northbound slip road from the A1 is now partially used as the entrance way to a retail park and was once carried by bridge, but no longer reaches the northbound carriageway, because it is cut off by the motorway continuing south.

The final section of the M1 was opened to junction 1 at Staples Corner in 1977. There the motorway meets the North Circular Road (A406) at a grade separated junction and roundabout. Unrealised plans from the 1960s would have seen the motorway continue through the junction on an elevated roadway to end at West Hampstead, where it would have met the North Cross Route, the northern section of the London Motorway Box, a proposed ring of urban motorway around the central area. The layout of the Staples Corner junction was originally built in accordance with those plans, although most of the London Ringways Plan had been cancelled by 1973. Around the same time, the section between the then-M10 and junction 5 was widened from the original two lanes to three.

On its completion, the M1 acted as a fast link road between London and Birmingham via the M6. It also provided a link to London Luton Airport for those regions, and its proximity to the site of the new town of Milton Keynes (designated in 1967) meant that it was soon providing a vital transport link to another major area.

Recent developments

Escalating costs across the whole of the Highways Agency programme, including the M1 project, on which costs had risen to £5.1 billion, as well as increasing opposition to major road expansion, as well as criticisms by the Transport Select Committee and the National Audit Office, led to wide-ranging re-assessments of the Agency's project costs. Widening was scaled back to the junctions 6A to 10 scheme that was already in progress, and from Nottingham and Mansfield (junctions 25–28), and hard shoulder running was to be used for other sections.

Many later developments, including smart motorway schemes, have been made to the M1, and these are detailed below. Recent concerns about accidents and deaths on the former hard shoulder have led to a halt and review into extending all lane running which reported in July 2021.

Developments

A5-M1 Link (Dunstable Northern Bypass)

The A5-M1 Link (Dunstable Northern Bypass) is a two-lane dual carriageway running east from the A5 north of Dunstable joining the M1 at a new junction 11a south of Chalton. Here, it is intended to join with a proposed Luton Northern Bypass to form a northern bypass for the wider conurbation. The A5-M1 Link aims to alleviate traffic congestion in Houghton Regis and Dunstable, reduce journey times for long-distance traffic travelling through Dunstable and improve the regional economy. The Highways Agency detrunked the A5 through Dunstable when the A5-M1 Link opened to the public in May 2017. As part of the Dunstable Town Centre Masterplan, Central Bedfordshire Council built the  Woodside Link to connect the new junction 11a to the industrial areas of Dunstable and Houghton Regis. Most of the road opened to traffic in autumn 2016 with the remaining section connecting to junction 11a.

M1/M69 junction
There is a proposal to widen the M1 to dual four-lane or dual five-lane between junctions 21 and 21a and construct a new link road between the M1 and the M69. During this work the Leicester Forest East services would be closed, and possibly relocated. Consultation took place in 2007. , work on this scheme has still not begun.

M1 junction 19 improvement 
Following the report of a public inquiry in March 2013, the Secretary of State for Transport announced on 18 July 2013 that work to update the Catthorpe Interchange at junction 19, between the M1 motorway, M6 motorway and A14 road, close to Catthorpe, would go ahead. Work on the £191million three-layer interchange started in January 2014. The scheme was fully opened to traffic in December 2016.

A421 dualling from Milton Keynes to M1 junction 13 
In conjunction with the M1 widening schemes and dualling of the A421 between M1 junction 13 and the A1 near St Neots (see above), proposals were made to widen the A421 between the M1 junction 13 in Bedfordshire and the Kingston roundabout in Milton Keynes. Exhibitions were held in June 2005 which rejected proposals to re-route the road in favour of widening the current road. In 2005, the project was given an estimated total cost of £33million.

Funding of £23.5million was confirmed by the government for these works, as part of the South East Midlands Local Enterprise Partnership "Local Growth Deal". As part of the government's pinch point reduction programme,  work commenced in 2014 on the A421 in Milton Keynes to improve the Kingston roundabout, and dual the section from it to (near) the Bedfordshire border, with the construction of two new roundabouts on the route. The road corridor includes a separate cycleway.

The upgrade work for this final phase of the plan, the section running from junction 13 to Eagle Farm roundabout, started in September 2018 and was completed in December 2020.

Smart Motorways

M1 widening and variable speed limits, junctions 6A to 10 (M25 to Luton South) 
Work began on the  section between the M25 and Luton (J6A-J10) in 2006 and opened in 2009, which included the construction of new parallel collector-distributor lanes between junctions 7 and 8.

The M10 spur was built as a motorway because it inevitably led to the M1, but as non-motorway traffic could now travel between the A414 at Hemel Hempstead and Park Street Roundabout without having to access the M1, the M10 was downgraded to an A road, and designated as part of the A414 to allow for this. The work also included widening or replacement of 11 underbridges on one or both carriageways, and replacing seven overbridges at a total cost of £294 million. A variable mandatory speed limit system was installed, making this the first smart motorway scheme on the M1.

M1 dynamic hard shoulder running, junctions 10 to 13 (Luton South to Milton Keynes South) 
This made the hard shoulder available to be opened as a traffic lane where additional capacity was necessary. Modifications were made to junctions 11 and 12, to allow for four lanes running through each junction, and the A421 from junction 13 to the Bedford southern bypass was also upgraded to two lanes each way during this period. The scheme will likely be converted to all lane running at some point in the 2020 decade, alongside all other dynamic hard shoulder running schemes. This was because a Government review into smart motorways found dynamic hard shoulder running was too confusing for drivers, leading to plans to convert all dynamic hard shoulders into permanent running lanes.

M1 widening and variable speed limits, junctions 25-28 (Nottingham to Mansfield) 
Work to widen the  section from Nottingham to Mansfield (J25-J28) to four lanes each way began in October 2007 and was completed in May 2010, at a cost of £340 million. A 50 mph limit, enforced by average speed cameras, was imposed for the period of construction, but it proved to be so effective that a permanent variable mandatory speed limit system was installed.

M1 widening and variable speed limits, junctions 13-16 (Milton Keynes South to Northampton West) 
National Highways converted the existing  section of the M1 between Milton Keynes and Northampton (J13-J16) into an all-lane-running (ALR) smart motorway consisting of four lanes running in both directions without a hard shoulder, with the project's estimated cost being £373million. Construction began in January 2018, with the scheme opening in stages until March 2023, when the project was fully complete.

Other proposals
There are plans to reduce the speed limit between M1 junctions 33 to 34, by Rotherham to 60 mph, to reduce levels of nitrogen dioxide. The plans are to be implemented before October 2020 and the trial period is expected to last from 12 to 15 months.

Incidents and accidents
 On 12 October 1970, a woman, Barbara Mayo, was abducted and murdered whilst hitchhiking up the motorway from London to Yorkshire. She was found dead in Ault Hucknall near the motorway in Derbyshire. The murder has never been solved.
 On 16 March 1972, 200 vehicles crashed in thick fog resulting in the deaths of nine people on the M1 near Ridgmont, north of Luton.
 On 8 January 1989, a Boeing 737 crashed onto the embankment of the M1 whilst attempting an emergency landing at East Midlands Airport in Leicestershire. There were no ground casualties nor vehicular damage on the motorway as a result of the crash, however 47 passengers on board the aircraft were killed and a further 74 passengers and crew members were seriously injured.
 On 6 September 1997, large sections of the northbound carriageway were closed between London and Northampton to allow for the funeral procession of Diana, Princess of Wales to Althorp. In an unprecedented event, police allowed pedestrians onto the normally busy northbound carriageway almost the entire length of the route to pay their respects.
 On 11 June 2003, three military tanks were thrown across the carriageway near junction 19 near Lutterworth when the transporter carrying them was involved in a crash; five were killed.
 An  stretch of the motorway was closed entirely on the morning of 11 December 2005, following a major explosion and fire at the Buncefield Oil Depot which is less than half a mile (800 m) from the M1.
 In June 2007, the section of M1 between junctions 32 and 36 was closed for a number of days after the Ulley Reservoir developed cracks after being deluged in the 2007 United Kingdom floods.
 Part of the motorway close to Tinsley Viaduct was closed to allow safe demolition of the Tinsley cooling towers in the early hours of 24 August 2008. The M1 remained closed for much of the day until the stability of the viaduct was confirmed.
 On 15 April 2011, a  stretch of the road was closed between Junctions 1 and 4 due to a fire at a scrapyard underneath the motorway. The road was fully re-opened early on 21 April 2011 with a 50 mph speed limit in force whilst repair work continued to an elevated section.
 On 26 August 2017, two lorries and a minibus crashed between junctions 14 and 15, near Newport Pagnell, shutting down the motorway for most of the day. Eight people were killed and three severely injured. The drivers of the lorries were charged with dangerous driving, with one also charged with drunk driving. The incident represented the largest loss of life as the result of a motorway accident since a crash on the M40 in 1993.

Junctions

{| style="margin-left:1em; margin-bottom:1em; color:black; font-size:95%;" class="wikitable"
|-  style="background:#0080d0; text-align:center; color:white; font-size:120%;"
| colspan="6" | M1 motorway junctions
|-
!scope=col|mile
!scope=col|km
!scope=col abbr="Southbound"|Southbound exits (B carriageway)
!scope=col|Junction
!scope=col abbr="Northbound"|Northbound exits (A carriageway)
!scope=col|Coordinates
|- style="text-align:center;"
|7.0
|11.3
| North Circular (West), Brent Cross, Wembley, Hanger Lane, (A406 West)
| J1Southern terminus
| Start of motorway
| 
|- style="text-align:center;"
|9.19.2
|14.6  14.8
| Central London (The City), HollowayNorth Circular (A406)(E) A1
| J2
|  No access
| 
|- style="text-align:center;"
|12.0
|19.3
|London Gateway services
|Services
|London Gateway services
| 
|- style="text-align:center;"
|13.213.5
|21.3  21.8
| Harrow, Edgware A41
| J4
|  No access
| 
|- style="text-align:center;"
|
|
| style=background:skyblue | Entering Greater London
|
| style=background:skyblue | Entering Hertfordshire
| 
|- style="text-align:center;"
|17.117.5
|27.5  28.1
| A41Watford A4008
| J5
| (M25 West)Aylesbury A41Watford A4008
| 
|- style="text-align:center;"
|19.720.0
|31.7  32.2
| North Watford A405
| J6
| (M25 East)St Albans A405
| 
|- style="text-align:center;"
|20.420.8
|32.9  33.5
| M25Stansted , Dartford, (M11, M20)Heathrow , (M40, M4, M3)
| J6aM25 interchange
|  No access
| 
|- style="text-align:center;"
|22.522.7
|36.2  36.6
| St Albans, Hatfield A414
| J7
|  No access
| 
|- style="text-align:center;"
|23.523.8
|37.8  38.3
| Hemel Hempstead A414
| J8
| Hemel Hempstead A414
| 
|- style="text-align:center;"
|27.928.3
|44.9  45.6
| St Albans (N) A5183
| J9
| Redbourn A5183
| 
|- style="text-align:center;"
|
|
| style=background:skyblue | Entering Hertfordshire
|
| style=background:skyblue | Entering Bedfordshire
| 
|- style="text-align:center;"
|30.330.6
|48.8  49.2
| Luton (S) & Airport  A1081
| J10
| Luton (S) & Airport  A1081
| 
|- style="text-align:center;"
|33.734.0
|54.3  54.7
| Luton (C), Dunstable (C) A505
| J11
| Luton (C), Dunstable (C) A505
| 
|- style="text-align:center;"
|
|
| Aylesbury A5, (A505)Dunstable (N)
|J11A
| Aylesbury A5, (A505)Dunstable (N)
| 
|- style="text-align:center;"
|38.9
|62.6
|Toddington services
|Services
|Toddington services
| 
|- style="text-align:center;"
|38.538.9
|62.0  62.6
| Flitwick A5120
| J12
| Flitwick A5120
| 
|- style="text-align:center;"
|45.245.4
|72.7  73.1
| Bedford, Milton Keynes (South) A421
| J13
| Bedford, Milton Keynes (South) A421
| 
|- style="text-align:center;"
|
|
| style=background:skyblue | Entering Bedfordshire
|
| style=background:skyblue | Entering Buckinghamshire
| 
|- style="text-align:center;"
|49.750.2
|80.0  80.8
| Milton Keynes, Newport Pagnell A509
| J14
| Milton Keynes, Newport Pagnell A509
| 
|- style="text-align:center;"
|53.7
|86.5
|Newport Pagnell services
|Services
|Newport Pagnell services
| 
|- style="text-align:center;"
|
|
| style=background:skyblue | Entering Buckinghamshire
|
| style=background:skyblue | Entering Northamptonshire
| 
|- style="text-align:center;"
|61.862.3
|99.4  100.2
| Northampton, Wellingborough A45, Rail Freight Terminal A508 Kettering (A43)
| J15
| Northampton, Wellingborough A45, Rail Freight Terminal A508 Kettering (A43)
| 
|- style="text-align:center;"
|64.364.9
|103.5  104.5
| Oxford A43 (M40)Northampton services
| J15aServices
| Oxford (M40)Northampton (W) A43Northampton Services
| 
|- style="text-align:center;"
|67.968.3
|109.2  109.9
| Northampton (W) A4500
| J16
| Daventry A45
| 
|- style="text-align:center;"
|75.1
|120.8
|Watford Gap services
|Services
|Watford Gap services
| 
|- style="text-align:center;"
|76.676.9
|123.3  123.8
|  No access
| J17
| Coventry (S) M45
| 
|- style="text-align:center;"
|78.578.9
|126.3  126.9
| Daventry A428 (A361), DIRFT
| J18
| Hinckley A5 Rugby, DIRFT (A428)
| 
|- style="text-align:center;"
|
|
| style=background:skyblue | Entering Northamptonshire
|
| style=background:skyblue | Entering Leicestershire
| 
|- style="text-align:center;"
|82.382.7
|132.4  133.1
| Felixstowe, Kettering A14
| J19M6/A14 interchange
| The North West  Coventry, Birmingham M6
| 
|- style="text-align:center;"
|85.586.1
|137.6 138.5
| Lutterworth A4303Rugby (A426), Magna Park
| J20
| Lutterworth A4303Market Harborough A4304Magna Park
| 
|- style="text-align:center;"
|96.196.6
|154.6  155.4
| Coventry, Birmingham M69 (M6)Leicester A5460
| J21
| Coventry M69Leicester A5460
| 
|- style="text-align:center;"
|97.7
|157.2
|Leicester Forest East services
|Services
|Leicester Forest East services
| 
|- style="text-align:center;"
|99.399.5
|159.8  160.1
| No access
| J21a
| Leicester (N), Newark A46
| 
|- style="text-align:center;"
|104.3104.7
|167.8  168.5
| Leicester A50, Coalville A511
| J22
| Ashby, Coalville A511
| 

|- style="text-align:center;"
|108.8109.2
|175.1  175.8
| Loughborough, Shepshed A512
| J23
| Loughborough, Shepshed A512
| 
|- style="text-align:center;"
|113.4113.6
|182.5  182.8
| The South West, Tamworth, Birmingham, A42 (M42)
| J23a  Services
| East Midlands  A453Donington services
| 
|- style="text-align:center;"
|114.9115.4
|184.9  185.7
| Nottingham, East Midlands  A453 Donington services
| J24
| Stoke A50Derby (A6)Nottingham (S) A453
| 
|- style="text-align:center;"
|115.8116.2
| 186.3  187.0
| Stoke A50Derby (A6)
| J24a
|  No access
| 
|- style="text-align:center;"
|
|
| style=background:skyblue | Entering Leicestershire
|
| style=background:skyblue | Entering Derbyshire
| 
|- style="text-align:center;"
|120.0120.5
|193.2  193.9
| Nottingham, Derby A52
| J25
| Derby, Nottingham A52
| 
|- style="text-align:center;"
|
|
| style=background:skyblue | Entering Derbyshire
|
| style=background:skyblue | Entering Nottinghamshire
| 
|- style="text-align:center;"
|124.1
|199.8
|Trowell services
|Services
|Trowell services
| 
|- style="text-align:center;"
|126.0126.6
|202.8  203.7
| Nottingham  A610
| J26
| Ripley, Nottingham A610
| 
|- style="text-align:center;"
|131.5132.0
| 211.7  212.4
| Heanor, Hucknall A608
| J27
| Mansfield A608
| 
|- style="text-align:center;"
|
|
| style=background:skyblue | Entering Nottinghamshire
|
| style=background:skyblue | Entering Derbyshire
| 
|- style="text-align:center;"
|135.0135.5
|217.2  218.0
| Derby A38Matlock (A615)
| J28
| Mansfield A38Matlock (A615)
| 
|- style="text-align:center;"
|138.3
|222.5
|Tibshelf services
|Services
|Tibshelf services
| 
|- style="text-align:center;"
|141.7142.3
| 228.1  229.0
| Mansfield A617Matlock (A632)
| J29
| Chesterfield A617
| 
|- style="text-align:center;"
|
|
| Markham Vale A6192Bolsover (A632)
| J29a
| Markham Vale A6192Bolsover (A632)
| 
|- style="text-align:center;"
|148.4148.8
|238.9  239.5
| Chesterfield (A619) Newark A616
| J30
| Sheffield (S) A6135Worksop (A619)
| 
|- style="text-align:center;"
|
|
| style=background:skyblue | Entering Derbyshire
|
| style=background:skyblue | Entering South Yorkshire
| 
|- style="text-align:center;"
|151.3
|243.5
|Woodall services
|Services
|Woodall services
| 
|- style="text-align:center;"
|153.8154.2
|247.5  248.2
| Worksop A57
| J31
| Sheffield (SE), Rotherham (S) A57
| 
|- style="text-align:center;"
|156.3156.6
|251.6  252.1
| The North, Doncaster, Hull M18
| J32M18 interchange
| The North, Doncaster, Hull, Rotherham (E) M18
| 
|- style="text-align:center;"
|158.8159.2
|255.6  256.2
| Sheffield (C), Rotherham (C) A630
| J33
| Sheffield (C), Rotherham (C) A630
| 
|- style="text-align:center;"
|161.5161.7
|259.9  260.3
| Sheffield (E), Rotherham (C), Meadowhall A6109:
| J34
| Sheffield (E), Rotherham (C), Meadowhall A6178:
| 
|- style="text-align:center;"
|164.9165.4
|265.4  266.2
| Rotherham (N) A629
| J35
| Rotherham (N) A629
| 
|- style="text-align:center;"
|166.7166.9
|268.2 268.6
|  No access
| J35a
| Manchester A616
| 
|- style="text-align:center;"
|168.0168.5
|270.3  271.2
| Sheffield (N), Barnsley A61
| J36
| Barnsley (S) A61
| 
|- style="text-align:center;"
|172.1172.6
|276.9  277.8
| Barnsley, Manchester A628
| J37
| Manchester, Barnsley A628
| 
|- style="text-align:center;"
|176.4176.9
|283.9 284.7
| Huddersfield A637
| J38
| Huddersfield A637
| 
|- style="text-align:center;"
|
|
| style=background:skyblue | Entering South Yorkshire
|
| style=background:skyblue | Entering West Yorkshire
| 
|- style="text-align:center;"
|178.5
|287.2
|Woolley Edge services
|Services
|Woolley Edge services
| 
|- style="text-align:center;"
|179.9180.4
|289.5  290.4
| Denby Dale A636
| J39
| Wakefield A636
| 
|- style="text-align:center;"
|182.6183.0
|293.8  294.5
| Wakefield, Dewsbury A638
| J40
| Dewsbury, Wakefield A638
| 
|- style="text-align:center;"
|185.1185.6
|297.9  298.7
| Wakefield, Morley A650
| J41
| Wakefield A650
| 
|- style="text-align:center;"
|186.5187.0
| 300.1  301.0
| Hull, Pontefract, Manchester, Bradford M62
| J42M62 interchange
| Manchester, Bradford, Leeds Bradford Hull M62
| 
|- style="text-align:center;"
|188.4189.0
|303.2  304.1
|  No access
| J43
| Leeds M621
| 
|- style="text-align:center;"
|189.4189.9
|304.8  305.6
| Leeds A639(M621)
| J44
| Leeds (S) A639
| 
|- style="text-align:center;"
|190.8191.2
| 307.1  307.7
| Leeds A63
Leeds Skelton Lake services
| J45
| Leeds (SE) A63
Leeds Skelton Lake services
| 
|- style="text-align:center;"
|193.7194.0
|311.7  312.2
| Leeds (E) A6120
| J46
| Leeds (E), Leeds/Bradford
 A6120Selby A63
| 
|- style="text-align:center;"
|196.6197.0
| 316.4  317.1
| Castleford A656Garforth A642
| J47
| Garforth A642The South (A1(M))
| 
|- style="text-align:center;"
|197.7
|318.1
| Start of motorway
| A1(M), J43Northern terminus
| The North, Wetherby A1(M)York (A64)
| 
|-
|colspan=6|Notes
 Data from driver location signs/distance marker posts are used to provide distance and carriageway identification information. Where a junction spans several hundred metres and the data is available, both the start and finish values for the junction are shown. Coordinate data from ACME Mapper.
|-

See also
 List of motorways in the United Kingdom

References

External links

 Highways Agency
 CBRD Motorway Database – M1
 The Motorway Archive:
 Hendon to Crick
 Crick to Doncaster
 Aston to Leeds
 M1/M18
 M1 extension to A1(M)
 BBC website The Backbone of Britain contains link to a video of 2'42" in length
 Major Road Ahead by the John Laing Film Unit, showing construction of the first section

 
1-0001m
Transport in the London Borough of Barnet
Roads in Bedfordshire
Roads in Buckinghamshire
Roads in Hertfordshire
Transport in Leicestershire
1-0001m
Transport in Northamptonshire
Transport in Nottinghamshire
Transport in South Yorkshire
Transport in West Yorkshire
Roads in Sheffield
Transport in Derbyshire
Transport infrastructure completed in 1959